Taiwan competed as Chinese Taipei at the 2008 Summer Olympics in Beijing, where it sent 80 competitors in a record 15 sports. Since 1984, athletes from Taiwan have competed at the Olympics as "Chinese Taipei", not as the "Republic of China (ROC)", due to opposition from the People's Republic of China.

According to the Taipei Times,

As in previous editions of the Summer Olympics, the flag of the Republic of China was not displayed. Instead, the Chinese Taipei Olympic flag was waved by fans, and displayed when the team won a medal. The National Banner Song, not the National Anthem of the Republic of China, was played at the gold medal ceremony.

Medalists

Archery

At the 2007 World Outdoor Target Championships, Chinese Taipei's men's team placed fourth and its women's team placed fifth. This qualified the nation to send full teams of three men and three women to the Olympics.

Men

Women

Athletics

Men
Track & road events

Field events

Women
Field events

Badminton

Baseball

Chinese Taipei finished third at the 2007 Asian Baseball Championship, forcing the team to seek Olympic qualification through the Final Qualifying Tournament. The team again finished third there, which was good enough to qualify for the Olympic tournament. Chinese Taipei made its third appearance in Olympic baseball in Beijing. The team's best result to date has been a silver medal in the inaugural tournament in 1992.

Manager: Hung I-Chung (洪一中 La New Bears).

Coaches: Hsieh Chang-Heng (謝長亨 Chinatrust Whales), Lu Ming-Tsu (呂明賜 La New Bears), Kung Jung-Tang (龔榮堂 National Training Team).

Results 
Group stage
All times are China Standard Time (UTC+8)

The top four teams will advance to the semifinal round.

Official Olympic Baseball Schedule

Cycling

Chinese Taipei will compete in Olympic cycling after receiving a wild-card invitation from the Union Cycliste Internationale.

Track
Omnium

Judo

Rowing

Men

Qualification Legend: FA=Final A (medal); FB=Final B (non-medal); FC=Final C (non-medal); FD=Final D (non-medal); FE=Final E (non-medal); FF=Final F (non-medal); SA/B=Semifinals A/B; SC/D=Semifinals C/D; SE/F=Semifinals E/F; QF=Quarterfinals; R=Repechage

Sailing

Men

M = Medal race; EL = Eliminated – did not advance into the medal race; CAN = Race cancelled;

Shooting

Women

Softball

Chinese Taipei qualified for the eight-team Olympic softball tournament in Beijing by winning  the Asian & Oceania Olympic Qualifying Tournament in February 2007.

Roster
Chen Miao-Yi
Chiang Hui-Chuan
Chueh Ming-Hui
Hsu Hsiu-Ling
Huang Hui-Wen
Lai Meng-Ting
Lai Sheng-Jung
Li Chiu-Ching
Lin Su-Hua
Lo Hsiao-Ting
Lu Hsueh-Mei
Pan Tzu-Hui
Tung Yun-Chi
Wen Li-Hsiu
Wu Chia-Yen

Results
The top four teams will advance to the semifinal round.

All times are China Standard Time (UTC+8)

August 12

August 13

August 14

August 15

August 16

August 17

Swimming

Men

Women

Table tennis

Chinese Taipei qualified two men and two women in singles competition in addition to the men's team competition and will be sending a total of five athletes to compete in table tennis.

Singles

Team

Taekwondo

Tennis

Weightlifting

Five weightlifters from Chinese Taipei will compete in Beijing.

External links
 "Taiwan athletes gear up for Beijing Olympics", Xinhua, July 26, 2008

See also
 Chinese Taipei at the 2008 Summer Paralympics

References

T
2008
2008 in Taiwanese sport